Speech recognition software is available for many computing platforms, operating systems, use models, and software licenses. Here is a listing of such, grouped in various useful ways.

Acoustic models and speech corpus (compilation)
The following list presents notable speech recognition software engines with a brief synopsis of characteristics.

Macintosh

Cross-platform web apps based on Chrome
The following list presents notable speech recognition software that operate in a Chrome browser as web apps. They make use of HTML5 Web-Speech-API.

Mobile devices and smartphones
Many mobile phone handsets, including feature phones and smartphones such as iPhones and BlackBerrys, have basic dial-by-voice features built in. Many third-party apps have implemented natural-language speech recognition support, including:

Windows

Windows built-in speech recognition
The Windows Speech Recognition version 8.0 by Microsoft comes built into Windows Vista, Windows 7, Windows 8 and Windows 10.
Speech Recognition is available only in English, French, Spanish, German, Japanese, Simplified Chinese, and Traditional Chinese and only in the corresponding version of Windows; meaning you cannot use the speech recognition engine in one language if you use a version of Windows in another language. Windows 7 Ultimate and Windows 8 Pro allow you to change the system language, and therefore change which speech engine is available. Windows Speech Recognition evolved into Cortana (software), a personal assistant included in Windows 10.

Windows 7, 8, 10, 11 third-party speech recognition
 Braina – Dictate into third party software and websites, fill web forms and execute vocal commands.
 Dragon NaturallySpeaking from Nuance Communications – Successor to the older DragonDictate product. Focus on dictation. 64-bit Windows support since version 10.1.
 SpeechMagic – Nuance Communications acquired Philips owned. Medical industry focus according to Frost & Sullivan. Standalone or embedded.
 Tazti – Create speech command profiles to play PC games and control applications – programs. Create speech commands to open files, folders, webpages, applications. Windows 7, Windows 8 and Windows 8.1 versions.
 Voice Finger – software that improves the Windows speech recognition system by adding several extensions to it. The software enables controlling the mouse and the keyboard by only using the voice. It is especially useful for aiding users to overcome disabilities or to heal from computer injuries.

Windows XP or 2000 only
 Microsoft Speech API – Speech recognition functionality included as part of Microsoft Office and on Tablet PCs running Microsoft Windows XP Tablet PC Edition. It can also be downloaded as part of the Speech SDK 5.1 for Windows applications, but since that is aimed at developers building speech applications, the pure SDK form lacks any user interface, and thus is unsuitable for end users.

Built-in software
Microsoft Kinect includes built-in software which allows speech recognition of commands.
Older generations of Nokia phones like Nokia N Series (before using Windows 7 mobile technology) used speech-recognition with family names from contact list and a few commands.
Siri, originally implemented in the iPhone 4S, Apple's personal assistant for iOS, which uses technology from Nuance Communications.
Cortana (software), Microsoft's personal assistant built into Windows Phone and Windows 10.

Interactive voice response
The following are interactive voice response (IVR) systems:

 CSLU Toolkit
 Genesys
 HTK – copyrighted by Microsoft, but allows altering software for licensee's internal use
 LumenVox ASR
 Tellme Networks; acquired by Microsoft

Unix-like x86 and x86-64 speech transcription software 
 Janus Recognition Toolkit (JRTk)
Mozilla DeepSpeech is developing an open-source Speech-To-Text engine based on Baidu's deep speech research paper.

Discontinued software
 IBM VoiceType (formerly IBM Personal Dictation System)
 IBM ViaVoice – Embedded version still maintained by IBM. No longer supported for versions above Windows Vista. Untested above macOS 10.4 or on Macintoshes with an Intel chipset.
 Quack.com; acquired by AOL; the name has now been reused for an iPad search app.
 SpeechWorks from Nuance Communications.
 Yap Speech Cloud – Speech-to-text platform acquired by Amazon.com.

See also

References 

Speech recognition
Speech recognition software